Canada's a Drag is a Canadian documentary series that premiered on CBC Gem on March 7, 2018. The show was created by Peter Knegt and Mercedes Grundy. Each episode focuses on a drag performer from a different Canadian city, inclusive of drag queens, drag kings and transgender or non-binary performers. It is produced by CBC Arts.

The series won the Canadian Screen Award for Best Original Non-Fiction Web Program or Series two years in a row at the 8th Canadian Screen Awards and 9th Canadian Screen Awards.

As of 2022, four performers profiled on the series have also been competitors in Canada's Drag Race, one has also been a competitor in The Boulet Brothers' Dragula, and one has been the subject of a full-length documentary film.

Featured drag performers

Season One (2018)
 Allysin Chaynes - Toronto
 Lourdes the Merry Virgin - Edmonton
 Berlin Stiller (The Girlfriend Experience) - Vancouver
 Gay Jesus - Toronto
 Prairie Sky - Winnipeg
 Sofonda Cox - Toronto
 Guizo LaNuit - Montreal
 Elle Noir - Halifax
 Tranie Tronic - Montreal

Season Two (2019)
 Alma Bitches - Vancouver
 Icesis Couture and Savannah Couture - Ottawa
 Tynomi Banks - Toronto
 Duke Carson - Calgary
 Crystal Slippers - Montreal
 Irma Gerd - St. John's
 Yovska - Toronto
 Pharaoh Moans - Winnipeg
 Eddi Licious - Victoria
 Manghoe Lassi - Toronto
 Jenna Telz - Kelowna
 Quanah Style - Vancouver

Season Three (2020)
 MX Wolverine - Ottawa
 Francheska Dynamites - Lethbridge
 Rose Butch - Vancouver
 Chiquita Mare - Moncton
 Charli Deville - Montreal
 Sapphoria - Edmonton
 Fay Slift & Fluffy Soufflé - Toronto
 Shay Dior - Vancouver
 Vivian Vanderpuss - Victoria
 Mikiki - Toronto

References

External links 

Canada's a Drag on CBC

2010s Canadian LGBT-related television series
2018 Canadian television series debuts
2018 web series debuts
2020s Canadian LGBT-related television series
Canadian LGBT-related web series
Canadian non-fiction web series
Canadian Screen Award-winning television shows
CBC Gem original programming
Drag (clothing) television shows
Canadian LGBT-related reality television series